Robert Burns Mayes (June 28, 1867 – February 18, 1921) was an American jurist. He was a state senator and justice of the Supreme Court of Mississippi from 1906 to 1912.

Early life 
Robert Burns Mayes was born on June 28, 1867, in Gallatin, Mississippi. He was the son of Herman Bowman Mayes, a prominent lawyer, and Charity (Barlow) Mayes. Mayes attended the public schools of Hazlehurst, Mississippi. He then studied law at the University of Mississippi, graduating with a bachelor's degree in 1888. He began practicing law in 1890.

Career 
In 1891, Mayes was elected to represent the 11th District as a Democrat in the Mississippi State Senate for the 1892-1896 term. In 1893, he was made a special agent of the United States Department of the Treasury and worked in this position until 1895. Mayes then moved to New York City, and practiced law before returning to Hazlehurst three years later. In 1900, Mayes was appointed to be the Chancellor of Mississippi's 5th Chancery District by Governor Andrew H. Longino; Mayes was re-appointed by Governor James K. Vardaman in 1904, and served until 1906. On May 10, 1906, Mayes was appointed to replace Jeff Truly as an associate justice of the Supreme Court of Mississippi. After the resignation of Chief Justice Albert H. Whitfield, Mayes became the Court's new chief justice on April 16, 1910. Mayes resigned from the Court on August 8, 1912, to return to private practice. He then joined the law firm known as Mayes & Mayes. He also became a district counsel for the Illinois Central Railroad and the Yazoo & Mississippi Valley Railroad. He was the President of the Mississippi State Bar Association from 1913 to 1914.

Personal life and death 
Mayes was a Methodist, and he was also a member of the Knights of Pythias. He married Annie Lanier in 1892, and they had one son, named John Lanier Mayes. He then married Leila Hart Beatty on February 23, 1900. After Leila's death, Mayes married for a third time to Malvina Yerger in May 1920. Mayes died from complications from surgery at 6 PM on February 18, 1921, in Jackson, Mississippi.

References

1867 births
1921 deaths
People from Hazlehurst, Mississippi
People from Jackson, Mississippi
People from New York City
Mississippi lawyers
Democratic Party Mississippi state senators
Justices of the Mississippi Supreme Court
Chief Justices of the Mississippi Supreme Court